Maxim Mikhaylovich Mikhaylov (born 19 March 1988) is a Russian volleyball player, a member of the Russia men's national volleyball team and Russian club VC Zenit-Kazan, gold medalist at the Olympic Games London 2012, silver medalist at the Olympic Games Tokyo 2020, bronze medalist at the Olympic Games Beijing 2008, gold medalist at the World Cup 2011, European Champion 2013 and 2017 and a multiple medalist of the World League.

Career
Maxim Mikhaylov started playing volleyball in the Leningrad region under the guidance of Valery Besprozvannykh. From 2003 till 2010 he performed as an outside striker for Yaroslavich Yaroslavl, a team from Yaroslavl.  In 2010 he moved to Zenit Kazan.

National team
In 2008 Russia, including Mikhaylov, won the bronze medal at the 2008 Olympic Games in Beijing. Mikhaylov helped propel Russia to a 10-1 record and the World Cup 2011 gold medal following Sunday's five-set victory over silver medalist Poland. At the next Olympics, the 2012 Olympic Games in London, his team won gold. Mikhaylov was named best spiker and best scorer at the 2012 Olympics. In September 2013 his national team beat Italy in the final of the European Championship (3–1) and achieved the gold medal. He missed the early rounds of the 2013 season due to a shoulder injury and most of the 2014 season due to injuries to both ankles, which required surgery. He played at the 2016 Rio Olympics and 2020 Tokyo Olympics, winning a silver medal at the latter.

Club
In 2010, Mikhaylov joined Zenit Kazan. With Zenit, he won the CEV Champions League in 2011–12, 2014–15, 2015–16,2016–17 and 2017-18 and was bronze medalist in World Championship Club in 2011. Mikhaylov was voted MVP in the 2016–17 CEV Champions League finals.

Personal life
Mikhaylov is married to Anastasia and has a son Nikita.

Sporting achievements

Clubs

FIVB Club World Championship
  Doha 2011 – with Zenit Kazan
  Betim 2015 – with Zenit Kazan
  Betim 2016 – with Zenit Kazan
  Poland 2017 – with Zenit Kazan
  Brazil 2019 – with Zenit Kazan

CEV Champions League
  2010/2011 – with Zenit Kazan
  2011/2012 – with Zenit Kazan
  2012/2013 – with Zenit Kazan
  2014/2015 – with Zenit Kazan
  2015/2016 – with Zenit Kazan
  2016/2017 – with Zenit Kazan
  2017/2018 – with Zenit Kazan
  2018/2019 – with Zenit Kazan

National championship
 2010/2011  Russian SuperCup 2010, with Zenit Kazan
 2010/2011  Russian Championship, with Zenit Kazan
 2011/2012  Russian SuperCup 2011, with Zenit Kazan
 2011/2012  Russian Championship, with Zenit Kazan
 2012/2013  Russian Championship, with Zenit Kazan
 2013/2014  Russian Cup, with Zenit Kazan
 2013/2014  Russian Championship, with Zenit Kazan
 2014/2015  Russian Cup, with Zenit Kazan
 2014/2015  Russian Championship, with Zenit Kazan
 2015/2016  Russian SuperCup 2015, with Zenit Kazan
 2015/2016  Russian Cup, with Zenit Kazan
 2015/2016  Russian Championship, with Zenit Kazan
 2016/2017  Russian SuperCup 2016, with Zenit Kazan
 2016/2017  Russian Cup, with Zenit Kazan
 2016/2017  Russian Championship, with Zenit Kazan
 2017/2018  Russian SuperCup 2017, with Zenit Kazan
 2017/2018  Russian Cup, with Zenit Kazan
 2018/2019  Russian Championship, with Zenit Kazan

National team
 2005  FIVB U19 World Championship 
 2007  FIVB U21 World Championship 
 2008  FIVB World League
 2008  Olympic Games
 2009  FIVB World League
 2010  FIVB World League
 2011  FIVB World League
 2011  FIVB World Cup
 2012  Olympic Games
 2013  FIVB World League
 2013  CEV European Championship
 2017  CEV European Championship
 2018  FIVB Nations League
 2021  Olympic Games

Individual
 2007 FIVB U21 World Championship – Best Server
 2010 FIVB World League – Best Scorer
 2010 FIVB World League – Best Spiker
 2010 FIVB World Championship – Best Spiker
 2011 CEV Champions League – Best Scorer
 2011 FIVB World League – Best Blocker
 2011 FIVB World League – Most Valuable Player
 2011 CEV European Championship – Best Scorer
 2011 CEV European Championship – Best Spiker
 2011 FIVB World Cup – Most Valuable Player
 2011 FIVB Club World Championship – Best Scorer
 2012 CEV Champions League – Best Server
 2012 CEV Champions League – Best Scorer
 2012 Olympic Games London – Best Scorer
 2012 Olympic Games London – Best Spiker
  2012 Order of Friendship
 2014 CEV Champions League – Best Opposite Spiker
 2015 CEV Champions League – Best Opposite Spiker
 2016 CEV Champions League – Best Opposite Spiker
 2016 Men's European qualification – Best Opposite Spiker
 2017 CEV Champions League – Most Valuable Player
 2017 Russian Championship – Most Valuable Player
 2017 Memorial of Hubert Jerzy Wagner – Most Valuable Player
 2017 CEV European Championship – Most Valuable Player
 2018 CEV Champions League – Most Valuable Player
 2018 FIVB Nations League – Most Valuable Player
 2021 Olympic Games Tokyo – Best Opposite Spiker

References

External links

worldleague.2015.fivb.com

1988 births
Living people
People from Vsevolozhsky District
Russian men's volleyball players
Olympic volleyball players of Russia
Volleyball players at the 2008 Summer Olympics
Volleyball players at the 2012 Summer Olympics
Olympic medalists in volleyball
Olympic bronze medalists for Russia
Medalists at the 2008 Summer Olympics
Olympic gold medalists for Russia
Medalists at the 2012 Summer Olympics
Volleyball players at the 2016 Summer Olympics
Volleyball players at the 2020 Summer Olympics
Medalists at the 2020 Summer Olympics
Olympic silver medalists for the Russian Olympic Committee athletes
Opposite hitters
VC Zenit Kazan players
Sportspeople from Leningrad Oblast